Shipovo is a rural locality (a village) in Akberdinsky Selsoviet, Iglinsky District, Bashkortostan, Russia. The population was 73 as of 2010. There are 18 streets.

Geography 
Shipovo is located 53 km south of Iglino (the district's administrative centre) by road. Karamaly is the nearest rural locality.

References 

Rural localities in Iglinsky District